Tjow Choon Boon (born 3 June 1945) is a Malaysian former cyclist. He competed in the team time trial and the individual pursuit events at the 1964 Summer Olympics.

References

External links
 

1945 births
Living people
Malaysian male cyclists
Olympic cyclists of Malaysia
Cyclists at the 1964 Summer Olympics
Place of birth missing (living people)
20th-century Malaysian people
21st-century Malaysian people